Alexandre Barrette is a French Canadian comedian and TV personality. He hosts several TV game shows seen on the V television network. They include Taxi Payant, the French Canadian version of Cash Cab and Atomes Crochus (Missing Links), the French Canadian version of the Match Game.

References

External links
 Official website

Living people
Canadian game show hosts
Year of birth missing (living people)